The Cayman Islands Cadet Corps (CICC) is a youth organisation in the Cayman Islands for male and female secondary school students between age 12 and 17. It was established in March 2002.

Core subjects

 Drill and Turnout
 Military Knowledge
 Fieldcraft
 Skill at Arms
 Shooting
 Navigation
 Expedition Training
 First Aid
 Physical Training
 Cadets in the Community

The Cayman Islands Cadet Corps Structure 
The CICC is split into 8 detachments:

John Gray Detachment -  (Alpha)    
Clifton Hunter Detachment - (Alpha)
Band Detachment - (Headquarters)
South Sound Detachment - (Headquarters) 
Cayman Brac Detachment -  (Bravo)
Triple C Detachment - (Bravo)
Marine Detachment -  (Bravo)
Section-9 - (S-9)

The main objectives of the CICC are defined in its Charter, Vision and the Mission Statement.

The Charter

The Cayman Island Cadet Corps is a National Voluntary Youth organisation. It is sponsored by the Governor's office and administered by a local headquarters led by the Commandant. The Cadet Corps were originally operated by the Ministry of Education with assistance from the RCIPS and provides military style, adventurous, and community activities. The Corps are currently under the Ministry of Health, Environment, Youth, Sports & Culture.

List of Commandants and Deputy Commandants of the Cayman Islands Cadet Corps
 Acting Commandant Lt. Col Braithwaite (2020–present) 
Acting Deputy Commandant Maj. Levy  (2021–present)
 Commandant Lt. Col O'Garro (2008–2021) 
 Deputy Commandant Lt. Col Braithwaite (2020 - 2021)
 Commandant Lt. Col O'Garro (2008–2021) 
Deputy Commandant Maj. Henry (2017 - 2019)
 Acting Commandant Lt.Col O'Garro (2008 - 2013) 
 Deputy Commandant Maj. White (2008 - 2017)
 Commandant Col Philph Hyre (2002 - 2008) 
 Deputy Commandant Lt.Col O'Garro (2002 - 2008)

List of Adjutant Training Officers of the Cayman Islands Cadet Corps
Adjutant Training Officer - Maj. Levy (2015–present)
Adjutant Training Officer - Maj. Henry  (2004- 2014)
Adjutant Training Officer - Maj. White  (2002-2004)

Sergeants and Warrant Officers of the Cayman Islands Cadet Corps
W01 Farley (2010–present)
W02 Richards (2002–present)
Ssgt Tibbetts (2010–present)
CPO Bonilla (2010 present)
Sgt Ebanks (2010–present)
Sgt McDonald (2010–present)
Sgt Alexander (2010–present)
Sgt Sookoonsingh (2010 present)

Cadet ranks
As well as learning new skills by working through the APC syllabus, experienced cadets can be awarded a rank. As the Army allows its soldiers to take on responsibility and leadership as non-commissioned officers (NCOs), so too does the ACF.

Cadet NCOs wear the issued cadet rank slides. The titles of some ranks may vary as cadet detachments are affiliated to Army regiments and adopt their terminology. There is usually only one Cadet RSM per county. In many counties, there is the opportunity for appointment to Cadet Under Officer (CUO), an appointment allowing the holder to stay in the officers' mess.

Although promotion is based on merit rather than progression through the APC syllabus, the following criteria must be met before a cadet is eligible for promotion:
 Cadet Lance Corporal - Passed APC 1 Star
 Cadet Corporal - Passed APC 2 Star
 Cadet Sergeant - Passed APC 3 Star 
 Cadet Staff/Colour Sergeant - Passed APC 4 Star
 Cadet Sergeant Major/Company Sergeant Major - Passed APC 4 Star 
 Cadet Regimental Sergeant Major - Master Cadet                                         
 Cadet Under Officer - Master Cadet - May be awarded to a cadet sergeant major who has shown officer potential and is in their last year as a cadet.

Officer ranks
The following are the insignia - emblems of authority - of the British Army. Badges for field officers were first introduced in 1810 and the insignia was moved to the shoulder boards in 1880 for all officers in full dress.

History 
The Cayman Islands premier has stated the desire to raise a Cayman Islands Defence Force when it can be afforded, which would make the Cayman Islands the fifth British Overseas Territory to have a locally raised army unit, but for the moment it has only the Cayman Islands Cadet Corps.

The CICC was established in 2001 and enacted by the Cayman Islands Cadet Corps Law of 2003.  The First Commandant of the CICC, now retired, was Colonel Philip Hyre. In 2013, Lieutenant Colonel Bobeth O’Garro was confirmed as the Commandant for the CICC, thus becoming the first female Commandant to lead a Corps in the Caribbean region.

Syllabus 
The Organisation has been modeled on the UK Army Cadet Force organisation (ACF).  The organisation aims to provide citizenship training via military-style activities, including instruction in military knowledge, drills, leadership, public speaking, field craft, land and sea navigation, signaling, physical fitness, first aid, arms skills, and music.

Cayman Islands
The Cayman Islands is a British Overseas Territory and uses the same school curriculum as the UK.  In September 2005 the CICC began working with the Cadet Vocational Qualification Organisation (CVQO) in the UK to add a vocational training element that has resulted in qualified cadets gaining the BTEC First Diploma in Public Services, which is
equivalent to passes in four subjects at GCSE. The CICC became the first Cadet Corps in the Caribbean to offer such a diploma.

The CICC has an overseas exchange program with UK, Canada and other Caribbean Islands.

References

External links 
 Cayman Islands Cadet Corps homepage
 https://web.archive.org/web/20110707163020/http://www.armycadetexchange.com/pages/cayman/2008/history-cadet-corps.pdf
 https://web.archive.org/web/20110728063154/http://www.caycompass.com/cgi-bin/CFPnews.cgi?ID=1024195

Youth organisations based in the Cayman Islands
2001 establishments in the Cayman Islands
Organizations established in 2001
Military of the Cayman Islands